Saros cycle series 158 for lunar eclipses occurs at the moon's ascending node, 18 years 11 and 1/3 days. It contains 81 events (47 listed before 3000).

This lunar saros is linked to Solar Saros 165.

See also 
 List of lunar eclipses
 List of Saros series for lunar eclipses

Notes

External links 
 www.hermit.org: Saros 156

Lunar saros series